Hampden Cox (3 April 1866 – 1940) was a Barbadian cricketer. He played in two first-class matches for the Barbados cricket team in 1887/88.

See also
 List of Barbadian representative cricketers

References

External links
 

1866 births
1940 deaths
Barbadian cricketers
Barbados cricketers
People from Saint Andrew, Barbados